Mark Donovan (born 12 October 1968) is a Welsh character actor best known for his roles in productions such as Shaun of the Dead, Black Books, In Bruges, and Murder Investigation Team. He also played a brief scene of Hamlet in an episode of the David Renwick comedy-drama, Love Soup.  His stage roles include Gozark in  Singin' in the Rain and Inspector Clay in Plan 9 from Outer Space.

Donovan is also a voice actor, providing voiceovers on the long-running BBC news programme Newsnight and extensively with Big Finish Productions on their range of audio dramas. He has appeared in The Tomorrow People, Dalek Empire, 2000 AD, Sarah Jane Smith, Bernice Summerfield and Luther Arkwright plays, but is best known for his various appearances in the Doctor Who range, most notably as the companion Shayde in the Fifth Doctor play No Place Like Home.

In October 2004 Donovan appeared on the cover of international magazine Fangoria to illustrate the magazine's coverage of Shaun of the Dead.

Personal life
Donovan was born in Aberdare and brought up in Bridgend, Wales.

Filmography

External links
Official website

1968 births
Living people
People from Aberdare
People from Bridgend
Welsh male film actors
Welsh male stage actors
Welsh male musical theatre actors
Welsh male television actors
Welsh male voice actors